Srbinovski is a Slavic Macedonian surname, derived from the name Srbin. Notable people with the surname include:

 Marjan Srbinovski, basketball player

 Milana Srbinovski, swimmer

See also
Srbinovci

Macedonian-language surnames